The fifth season of the American ABC fantasy-drama series Once Upon a Time was ordered on May 7, 2015. It began airing on September 27, 2015, and ended on May 15, 2016. On June 9, 2015, the promotion of Rebecca Mader and Sean Maguire to series regulars was announced for the fifth season, portraying their characters Zelena / Wicked Witch of the West and Robin Hood, respectively, while a few days later, Michael Socha was confirmed to not be returning as a series regular as Will Scarlet / Knave of Hearts. The fifth season also saw the series reach its 100th episode, which aired on March 6, 2016 as the mid-season premiere.

Existing fictional characters introduced to the series during the season include the main antagonists for the two volumes, King Arthur, Nimue and Hades, alongside Guinevere, Merlin, Merida, Percival, Hercules, Megara, Zeus, Poole, Jekyll and Hyde. The season also saw the return of numerous deceased characters from previous seasons, including the Blind Witch, Cora Mills / the Queen of Hearts, Peter Pan, Cruella De Vil, Baelfire / Neal Cassidy, Milah, Prince Henry, Liam Jones, Prince James, Gaston, Claude, and Stealthy.

Premise
With Emma having become the new Dark One, her family travels to Camelot to find the sorcerer Merlin, in a bid to remove the darkness from her vessel. The heroes then met King Arthur and Queen Guinevere of Camelot, with both on the hunt of the Dark One's dagger to make Excalibur whole. The trip to Camelot is cut short when another Dark Curse is cast, returning everyone to Storybrooke, where it is revealed that Hook had also become a Dark One and is responsible for the new curse. The battle to destroy the darkness leads to the death of Hook, prompting Emma and the heroes to take a trip to the Underworld where Hades, as well as most of the deceased villains, have plans of their own to get back to the land of the living. Hook is eventually resurrected, but a bid from Mr. Gold to capture all of Storybrooke's magic results in the arrival of Mr. Hyde and refugees from the Land of Untold Stories to Storybrooke, as well as the separation of Regina Mills and her evil self, who wages war on Regina.

Cast and characters

Regular
 Ginnifer Goodwin as Snow White / Mary Margaret Blanchard
 Jennifer Morrison as Emma Swan / Dark Swan
 Lana Parrilla as Evil Queen / Regina Mills
 Josh Dallas as Prince Charming / David Nolan / Prince James
 Emilie de Ravin as Belle French
 Colin O'Donoghue as Captain Hook / Killian Jones
 Jared S. Gilmore as Henry Mills
 Rebecca Mader as Wicked Witch of the West / Zelena
 Sean Maguire as Robin Hood
 Robert Carlyle as Rumplestiltskin / Mr. Gold

Recurring

 Liam Garrigan as King Arthur
 Elliot Knight as The Sorcerer / Merlin / the Usher
 Joana Metrass as Guinevere
 Lee Arenberg as Grumpy / Dreamy / Leroy
 Beverley Elliott as Widow Lucas / Granny
 Andrew Jenkins as Percival
 Sinqua Walls as Lancelot
 Amy Manson as Merida
 Olivia Steele Falconer as Violet
 Keegan Connor Tracy as The Blue Fairy / Mother Superior
 Timothy Webber as the Apprentice
 Meghan Ory as Red Riding Hood / Ruby
 Jamie Chung as Mulan
 David Anders as Dr. Victor Frankenstein / Dr. Whale
 Barbara Hershey as Cora Mills / Queen of Hearts
 Caroline Ford as Nimue
 Robbie Kay as Malcolm / Peter Pan / Pied Piper
 Greg Germann as Hades
 Giancarlo Esposito as Magic Mirror / Sidney Glass
 Victoria Smurfit as Cruella De Vil / Cruella Feinberg
 Tony Perez as Prince Henry Mills
 Teri Reeves as Dorothy Gale
 Michael Raymond-James as Baelfire / Neal Cassidy
 Emma Caulfield as the Blind Witch

Guest

 Mckenna Grace as Young Emma
 Ryan Robbins as Sir Morgan
 Paul Telfer as Lord Macintosh
 Glenn Keogh as King Fergus
 Caroline Morahan as Queen Elinor
 Lily Knight as Witch of DunBroch
 Adam Croasdell as Brennan Jones
 Oliver Bell as Young Killian
 Eric Keenleyside as Maurice / Moe French
 Bailee Madison as Young Snow White
 Jonathan Whitesell as Hercules
 Kacey Rohl as Megara
 Rachel Shelley as Milah
 Bernard Curry as Liam Jones
 Costas Mandylor as Captain Silver
 Jeff Gulka as Boq
 Paul Scheer voices Scarecrow
 Wes Brown as Gaston
 Ava Acres as Young Regina
 Isabella Blake-Thomas as Young Zelena
 Rya Kihlstedt as Cleo Fox
 Max Chadburn as Natasha "Tasha" Morris
 Geoff Gustafson as Stealthy
 David Hoflin as Zeus
 Hank Harris as Dr. Jekyll / the Groundsman
 Sam Witwer as Mr. Hyde / the Warden
 Arnold Pinnock as Poole / the Orderly
 Tzi Ma as the Dragon

Episodes

Production

Development
The season has been confirmed to be split into two halves, with the mid-season premiere being the 100th episode.  In October 2015, Horowitz announced that the episode set to air on November 15, 2015 was set to be a two-hour episode. He later clarified that the season's twelfth episode would be considered the 100th episode of the show, stating "it's all semantics. But yes, we're considering 512 the 100th!" when discussing the fourth-season episode, "Smash the Mirror", being two separate episodes.

Casting

On June 9, 2015, it was announced that Rebecca Mader  and Sean Maguire had been promoted to series regulars for the fifth season, portraying their characters Zelena / Wicked Witch of the West and Robin Hood, respectively, while it was later revealed that Michael Socha would not be returning as a series regular as Will Scarlet / Knave of Hearts although further appearances as a recurring or guest star were hinted. Adam Horowitz confirmed via Twitter that Emilie de Ravin would return as Belle, while Vine Report confirmed the return of Jennifer Morrison as Emma Swan. On June 26, 2015, Josh Dallas confirmed his return as Prince Charming / David Nolan and Horowitz confirmed that there would be ten series regulars for the season. During Comic-Con 2015, Ginnifer Goodwin, Lana Parrilla, Colin O'Donoghue and Robert Carlyle were confirmed to return as Snow White / Mary Margaret Blanchard, Evil Queen / Regina Mills, Captain Killian "Hook" Jones and Rumplestiltskin / Mr. Gold respectively, while Morrison's character was confirmed to take on the moniker "Dark Swan". Jared S. Gilmore also returned as Henry Mills.

On June 26, 2015, it was revealed that Sinqua Walls would return as Lancelot. On July 1, 2015, it was announced that Liam Garrigan would play King Arthur during the first half of the season,  while Gabe Khouth  and Lee Arenberg confirmed via social media that they would be returning as Sneezy / Tom Clark and as Grumpy / Dreamy / Leroy respectively. On July 10, Beverley Elliott and Keegan Connor Tracy confirmed via their Twitter accounts that they would be returning as Widow Lucas / Granny and Blue Fairy / Mother Superior respectively while it was also confirmed that Elliot Knight, Joana Metrass and Andrew Jenkins had been cast as Merlin, Guinevere and Percival respectively.

Adam Horowitz announced on Twitter that Amy Manson had been cast in the role of the Scottish archer Princess Merida from Brave. Addressing rumours surrounding the characters origins Kitsis and Horowitz stated, "we are sticking to the canon of the movie Brave in terms of who her parents are and where she came from, but post-movie is where our Once Upon a Time spin comes into play". On September 8, Meghan Ory was confirmed to be returning for multiple episodes of the season as Little Red Riding Hood / Ruby, while on September 15, Horowitz revealed that Jamie Chung would be returning as Mulan. Both Chung and Ory made their first appearance this season in "The Bear King".

The premiere episode of the season, "The Dark Swan", saw the return of David-Paul Grove as Doc, Faustine Di Bauda as Sleepy, Jeffrey Kaiser as Dopey, Michael Coleman as Happy, Mig Macario as Bashful, Raphael Alejandro as Roland, Timothy Webber as the Apprentice and Ingrid Torrance as the Severe Nurse who is revealed during the episode to be the show's version of Nurse Ratched from Ken Kesey's One Flew Over the Cuckoo's Nest, and introduced Lee Majdoub as Sir Kay and Mckenna Grace as young Emma. Towards the end of the month, David Anders was confirmed to be returning as Dr. Victor Frankenstein / Dr. Whale. The second episode of the season, "The Price", introduced Olivia Steele Falconer as Violet, a love interest for Henry.

On October 14, it was announced that Adam Croasdell was cast as Hook's father, who would appear in a flashback before the midseason finale, and was later revealed to be called Brennan. The fifth episode, "Dreamcatcher", saw the introduction of Ryan Robbins as Sir Morgan, Violet's father, and Guy Fauchon as Vortigan. The sixth episode of the season, "The Bear and the Bow", introduced Paul Telfer as Lord Macintosh, Marco D'Angelo as Lord MacGuffin and Josh Hallem as Lord Dingwall while the seventh episode, "Nimue", saw the introductions of Jason Simpson as Adda, Caroline Ford as Nimue, Darren Moore as Vortigan and Graham Verchere as a younger Merlin's Apprentice.

On October 27, Glenn Keogh and Caroline Morahan were cast as Merida's parents King Fergus and Queen Elinor respectively. During October and November 2015, multiple recurring characters from previous seasons were confirmed to be returning for the 100th episode, "Souls of the Departed", including Barbara Hershey as Cora, Robbie Kay as Peter Pan, Giancarlo Esposito as Magic Mirror / Sidney Glass, and Emma Caulfield as the Blind Witch, who was last seen during the first season episode "True North". The episode also introduced a recurring character, Hades (initially dubbed "The Distinguished Gentleman"), who was portrayed by Greg Germann. On February 22, it was announced that Michael Raymond-James will also return in the 100th episode as the deceased Neal Cassidy. 

On November 10, it was announced that Victoria Smurfit would return as Cruella De Vil for numerous episodes during the second half of the season, beginning with the thirteenth episode, "Labor of Love". On November 16, it was announced that Bailee Madison would be returning in the same episode to reprise her role as a young Snow White, joined by newcomers Jonathan Whitesell and Kacey Rohl, who would be portraying Hercules and Megara, respectively. On December 3, 2015, the cast of the mid-season finale, "Swan Song", was revealed with Eric Keenleyside returning as Maurice, Belle's father and Oliver Bell being introduced as a young Killian. On December 4, it was announced that Rachel Shelley would be reprising her role as Milah, Rumplestiltskin's ex-wife and Hook's ex-lover, for at least one episode in the second half of the season. On December 8, it was announced that the character of Dorothy Gale (previously portrayed by Matreya Scarrwener) will be returning midway through the second half of the season to be portrayed by a new actress, as the character will be aged up to her late 20s-early 30s. On December 18, it was revealed that the recurring role had been recast to Teri Reeves, who would be making her first appearance in "Our Decay". On January 8, 2016, it was announced that the character of Gaston from Beauty and the Beast will be reappearing in an upcoming episode in the back-half of the season. This marks the character's first appearance since the season one episode "Skin Deep". Wes Brown was later revealed to be taking over the role from Sage Brocklebank. On February 9, it was announced that Ava Acres and Isabella Blake-Thomas were cast as young versions of Regina and Zelena, respectively. They appeared via flashbacks in the nineteenth episode, "Sisters". On February 18, it was announced that Costas Mandylor would be appearing as Captain Silver, a pirate from Hook's past. On February 23, it was announced that Rya Kihlstedt had been cast as Cleo, Emma's former mentor, in a flashback to a time before Emma's time as a bail bondswoman. On March 15, it was announced that Sam Witwer and Hank Harris would be appearing in the recurring roles of "Jacob" and "Nathaniel", with their roles continuing into the sixth season. They were later revealed to be portraying Mr. Hyde and Dr. Jekyll, respectively.

Promotion 
The first half of the season used the tag-line "#DarkSwan" for the entire duration of its run.

Ratings

Notes

References

External links
 

2015 American television seasons
2016 American television seasons
Season 5